Adele Garavaglia (1869–1944) was an Italian stage and film actress.

Selected filmography
 Golden Arrow (1935)
 These Children (1937)
 The Former Mattia Pascal (1937)
 The Document (1939)
 The Faceless Voice (1939)
 The Sons of the Marquis Lucera (1939)
 The King's Jester (1941)
 Idyll in Budapest (1941)
 Piccolo mondo antico (1941)
 Blood Wedding (1941)
 The Jester's Supper (1942)
 The Two Orphans (1942)
 Odessa in Flames (1942)
 Special Correspondents (1943)
 Rita of Cascia (1943)
 The White Angel (1943)
 Mist on the Sea (1944)
 The Ten Commandments (1945)

References

Bibliography
 Bert Cardullo. Vittorio De Sica: Director, Actor, Screenwriter. McFarland, 2002.

External links

1869 births
1944 deaths
Italian stage actresses
Italian film actresses
Actors from Turin